Toploye or Toploe (Russian: То́плое) is a rural locality (a selo) in Maloserdobinsky district, Penza Oblast, Russia. The population was 513 (2010 census).

Geography 
It is located 10 km south of Malaya Serdoba and 90 km south of Penza, near the border with the Saratov Oblast, in a steppe area.

History 
The village was founded by General Pyotr Alexandrovich Soymonov on land granted to him by decree of Empress Catherine II in 1787. In 1800 it was inherited by his daughter Gagarina Ekaterina Petrovna.

Description 
In the village on January 1, 2022 - 210 households, a 300-seat house of culture, a 150-seat primary school, a paramedic-obstetric station, a school stadium, a shop, historical and cultural monuments: a monument to fellow countrymen who died during the Great Patriotic War, a monument to the victims of the famine of 1933, the Mikhailo-Arkhangelsk Church, 4 ponds. 7 streets: Zazhigina (central), Kuzyatovka, Chuvarleevka, Kozina, Orlovka, Mira, Molodezhnaya. On April 18, 2020, cellular communication presented by Tele2 appeared for the first time in the village.

Incidents 

As a result of the shooting that occurred on May 8, 2019, 2 people were killed, two more were injured.

Notable people 
 (1925-2001) is a Lieutenant Colonel of the Soviet Army, participant of the Great Patriotic War, Hero of the Soviet Union.

References 

Populated places in Maloserdobinsky District